Svratka may refer to places in the Czech Republic:

Svratka (river), a river in the South Moravian Region
Svratka (Žďár nad Sázavou District), a town in the Vysočina Region
Radešínská Svratka, a municipality and village in the Vysočina Region